Frimley Green is a large village and ward of  in the Borough of Surrey Heath in Surrey, England, approximately  southwest of central London.

Lakeside Country Club was the national venue for the BDO international darts competition. It was played yearly in the village between 1986 and 2019.

The nearest railway stations are Frimley on the line between Ascot and Aldershot, Farnborough North on the North Downs Line and Farnborough (Main) on the South West Main Line.

Geography

Soil, elevation and boundaries
The land slopes down from Deepcut, partly on the Chobham Ridges to the east, to the River Blackwater which is preceded by the lakes and small woods in the south-west of the ward which form the boundary with Hampshire. Most of the woods and lakes are sectioned off by the Ascot to Guildford Line, the only railway within its bounds, which at the next station south merges into the Alton Line from London to Alton, Hampshire then becomes part of the North Downs Line.

Amenities and transport

Frimley Green, as with many British villages bearing the word green, is named after a central village green. The Basingstoke Canal runs alongside the park in the south and has a traditional wharf and inn here. Frimley Green's main green spaces comprise large playing fields, a wooded area with an activity trail and a miniature railway.

Frimley Lodge Park consisting of wide-ranging recreational areas is between the developed south-centre of Frimley Green and Mytchett.

The nearest railway station is Frimley which is linked to Ash Vale. Otherwise in neighbouring settlements are Farnborough North on the North Downs Line and Farnborough (Main) (on the South West Main Line from Southampton to London Waterloo which marks the southern border). Stagecoach South bus services connect the village to Farnborough (and to Camberley, which is also served as the next station north of Frimley by rail).

Main schools are Frimley Church of England School and Cross Farm Infant School.

The main road connecting the area inter-regionally is the M3 motorway, centred  to the north, which has a junction near to its closest point.

History

As part of Frimley

Frimley was a chapelry of Ash which local nobles had established as a manor from 1277. Henry Elliot Malden in the Victoria County History (1911–12) believes Frimley manor may have been the land in Ash purchased by Bartholomew de Winton, Abbot of Chertsey Abbey in 1277, from a Sir Walter Raleigh (not his more famous explorer namesake). Henry VIII granted it to Sir John White of Aldershot. James Tichborne sold the remaining land, chiefly the manor house to Mr. Tekel(l) and by 1911 the land had virtually all been subdivided.

Separation of identity and growth

Frimley Green gained, from its mother area, Frimley, half of a formal identity in 1889, when its first church was built, replaced in 1912. This remains joined with Mytchett in providing a choice of services, offered by the Church of England.

Catering to an expanded late 20th century population across the west of the district, in 1969 a Roman Catholic church was built just across the border in Frimley to the north and Frimley Park Hospital was built in 1974 in Frimley.

Sport and leisure
Lakeside Country Club is to the south of the village, and hosted the British Darts Organisation’s (BDO) World Professional Darts Championship each January from 1986 to 2019 before the event moved to The Indigo at the O2 Arena, London.

Frimley Green F.C. are the local football team, and play in the Premier Division of the Combined Counties Football League.

Demography
At the United Kingdom Census 2011 its population had risen from 5,639 (ten years before) to 5,717. As to households there were 2,266, owned by 47.1% of people on a loan and 35.2% outright. Greater than the national and local averages, 55.2% of the population described their health as very good.

The ward was created on the establishment of a council in 1965.

Notable residents
Dame Ethel Smyth, composer
Christopher Howarth, figure skater

External links

 Frimley Green Cricket Club (Ground: Frimley Green Park)
 Photographs of Frimley Green 1906-1965  Vision of Britain - The University of Portsmouth and others
 Mytchett, Frimley Green & Deepcut. A focus on the three villages (tripos.org.uk)
  Mytchett, Frimley Green & Deepcut Society

References

 
Surrey Heath